Burleene Township is a township in Todd County, Minnesota, United States. The population was 365 at the 2000 census.

Burleene Township was organized in 1888.

Geography

Demographics
As of the census of 2000, there were 365 people, 134 households, and 101 families residing in the township.  The population density was 10.2 people per square mile (3.9/km2).  There were 153 housing units at an average density of 4.3/sq mi (1.6/km2).  The racial makeup of the township was 100.00% White.

There were 134 households, out of which 32.8% had children under the age of 18 living with them, 68.7% were married couples living together, 3.7% had a female householder with no husband present, and 23.9% were non-families. 21.6% of all households were made up of individuals, and 9.7% had someone living alone who was 65 years of age or older.  The average household size was 2.72 and the average family size was 3.21.

In the township the population was spread out, with 27.4% under the age of 18, 7.1% from 18 to 24, 25.5% from 25 to 44, 27.4% from 45 to 64, and 12.6% who were 65 years of age or older.  The median age was 39 years. For every 100 females, there were 107.4 males.  For every 100 females age 18 and over, there were 108.7 males.

The median income for a household in the township was $32,143, and the median income for a family was $35,625. Males had a median income of $26,563 versus $20,179 for females. The per capita income for the township was $21,204.  About 6.3% of families and 8.5% of the population were below the poverty line, including 2.1% of those under age 18 and 20.8% of those age 65 or over.

References

Townships in Todd County, Minnesota
Townships in Minnesota